Heat of the Sun is a British television crime drama series, created by Russell Lewis and Timothy Prager, that first aired on ITV on 28 January 1998. Set in 1930s Kenya, the series stars Trevor Eve as Superintendent Albert Tyburn, a Scotland Yard criminal investigations officer who is sent to work in Nairobi to reveal the underside of the expatriate community in Kenya, exploring murders against issue of race and class, drug use, and sexuality. Susannah Harker stars as his romantic interest, Emma Fitzgerald, an aviator who is modelled on Beryl Markham. The series was a joint production between Carlton Productions and WGBH Boston.

The series was shot on location in Zimbabwe, with Ted Childs (Carlton) and Rebecca Eaton (WGBH) acting as executive producers. Ann Tricklebank (Carlton) served as series producer. Russell Lewis penned the episodes Private Lives, and The Sport of Kings, while fellow creator Timothy Prager penned the episode Hide in Plain Sight. Adrian Shergold directed Private Lives, Diarmuid Lawrence directed Hide in Plain Sight, and Paul Seed directed The Sport of Kings.

In the United States, the series aired on the PBS as part of their Mystery! anthology strand. Hide in Plain Sight and The Sport of Kings were each split into two parts, bringing the US broadcast to five episodes in total. The complete series was released on Region 2 DVD in the United Kingdom on 6 July 2009.

Cast
 Trevor Eve as Supt. Albert Tyburn 
 Susannah Harker as Emma Fitzgerald 
 Michael Byrne as Police Comm. Ronald Burkitt 
 Julian Rhind-Tutt as Asst. Supt. James Valentine
 Freddie Annobil-Dodoo as Cpl. Jonah Karinde 
 David Horovitch as Dr. Emil Mueller 
 Sean Gallagher as Chico de Ville 
 Shaheen Jassat as Sub Inspector Singh 
 Cathryn Harrison as Charlotte Elliott 
 Paul Brooke as Sir Rex Willoughby

Episodes

References

External links

1990s British drama television series
1998 British television series debuts
1998 British television series endings
1990s British crime television series
1990s British television miniseries
English-language television shows
ITV television dramas
Carlton Television
Television series by ITV Studios